Csaba Nagy Lakatos (born 26 November 1962) is a Romanian bobsledder. He competed at the 1988 Winter Olympics and the 1992 Winter Olympics.

References

1962 births
Living people
Romanian male bobsledders
Olympic bobsledders of Romania
Bobsledders at the 1988 Winter Olympics
Bobsledders at the 1992 Winter Olympics
Sportspeople from Miercurea Ciuc